Aplanodes may refer to:
 Aplanodes (planthopper), a genus of true bugs in the family Delphacidae
 Aplanodes (plant), a genus of flowering plants in the family Brassicaceae